Chimney Rock is a village in Rutherford County, North Carolina, United States. The population was 113 at the 2010 census. The village takes its name from a large granite outcropping located on a summit above the village itself in Chimney Rock State Park.

Geography
The town shares a border with the town of Lake Lure.

Demographics

2020 census

As of the 2020 United States census, there were 140 people, 81 households, and 48 families residing in the village.

2000 census
As of the census of 2000, there were 175 people, 74 households, and 51 families residing in the village. The population density was 63.3 people per square mile (24.4/km2). There were 200 housing units at an average density of 72.3 per square mile (27.9/km2). The racial makeup of the village was 94.86% White, 0.57% Native American, 2.29% from other races, and 2.29% from two or more races. Hispanic or Latino of any race were 4.00% of the population.

There were 74 households, out of which 25.7% had children under the age of 18 living with them, 58.1% were married couples living together, 5.4% had a female householder with no husband present, and 31.1% were non-families. 21.6% of all households were made up of individuals, and 8.1% had someone living alone who was 65 years of age or older. The average household size was 2.36 and the average family size was 2.80.

In the village, the population was spread out, with 21.7% under the age of 18, 6.3% from 18 to 24, 30.3% from 25 to 44, 25.7% from 45 to 64, and 16.0% who were 65 years of age or older. The median age was 39 years. For every 100 females, there were 118.8 males. For every 100 females age 18 and over, there were 110.8 males.

The median income for a household in the village was $29,583, and the median income for a family was $29,583. Males had a median income of $28,250 versus $22,813 for females. The per capita income for the village was $17,142. About 15.8% of families and 14.7% of the population were below the poverty line, including 11.1% of those under the age of eighteen and 20.0% of those 65 or over.

Trivia

The climax of Michael Mann's film version of James Fenimore Cooper's The Last of the Mohicans was filmed along one of the pathways across from Chimney Rock State Park.

Parts of the movie version of the Stephen King novel Firestarter were also filmed here.

References

External links
 Chimney Rock NC Information
 Hickory Nut Gorge Chamber of Commerce
 Carolina Mountain Land Conservancy

Villages in North Carolina
Villages in Rutherford County, North Carolina